Saman Ghanbarizadeh (born 21 September 1991 in Dezful, Iran), also known as Saman Ghanbari, is an Iranian motorcyclist, motorcycle racer and trainer in the field of stunt riding.

Ghanbarizadeh is the first Iranian motorcyclist in the style of dramatic movements and one of the phenomena of Iranian motorcycling in recent years.

Life 
Saman Ghanbari began his sports career as a child. Saman worked first in soccer and then in bodybuilding and achieved some success at county and provincial level. Motorbike was one of his favorite interests from a young age and he started working seriously in this field as a teenager. At first, he was involved in cross-country motoring, and then acquaintance with the motorcycling field led him to become the first Iranian motorcyclist in the field. Many years of work and practice in this field has enabled him to win the Asian and World Championships. He won second place in the first year of Asian competitions. in 2018 won first place in Asian competition. He was also placed ninth in the world among thirty participants.

In 2019, Saman participated in the Asre Jadid television talent show and performed in it.

Professional career

Stunt Masters Cup 

 2016: 2nd place, Dubai, UAE
 2017: 2nd place in Asia, 9th place in the world, Dubai, UAE
 2018: 1st place in the Asia, 9th place in the world, Ras Al Khaimah, UAE
 2018: 10th place at World Championship, Dubai, UAE

References 
https://video.varzesh3.com/video/235210/%D8%AD%D8%B1%DA%A9%D8%A7%D8%AA-%D9%86%D9%85%D8%A7%DB%8C%D8%B4%DB%8C-%D8%A8%D8%A7-%D9%85%D9%88%D8%AA%D9%88%D8%B1-%D8%AF%D8%B1-%D8%A7%D8%B3%D8%AA%D9%88%D8%AF%DB%8C%D9%88-%D9%BE%D8%AE%D8%B4-%D8%B2%D9%86%D8%AF%D9%87

External links 
 

Iranian stunt performers
1991 births
Motorcycle stunt performers
Living people